Malcolm Jenkins (born December 20, 1987) is a former American football safety who played for 13 seasons in the National Football League (NFL). He played college football at Ohio State, earning consensus All-American honors, and winning the Jim Thorpe Award as a senior. He was drafted by the New Orleans Saints in the first round of the 2009 NFL Draft and played for the Philadelphia Eagles from 2014 to 2019.

Early years
Jenkins grew up in Piscataway, New Jersey and played high school football at Piscataway Township High School, where he helped lead his team to three consecutive state championships. He played both wide receiver and defensive back for the Chiefs football team. He also excelled at track, winning the state title in the 400 metres as a junior.

Considered a three-star recruit by Rivals.com, Jenkins was listed as No. 61 cornerback prospect in the nation in 2005.

College career
During his freshman season at Ohio State, Jenkins spent most of his time in the nickelback position. He finished the season with 37 tackles in 10 games. In 2006, he started all 13 games at corner and was a consensus first-team All-Big Ten. He finished '06 with 55 tackles and four interceptions. As a junior in 2007 Jenkins recorded 47 tackles and four interceptions and was named a first-team All-American by Pro Football Weekly and a first-team All-Big Ten for the second consecutive year. As a senior in 2008 he won the Jim Thorpe Award, which is given to the nation's best defensive back, after recording 57 tackles and three interceptions.

Jenkins is a member of Omega Psi Phi Fraternity. He was vice president, stepmaster, and chaplain of the Ohio State chapter; he has prominent fraternity brands on his upper left arm, and another one on his chest.

Professional career
Jenkins was considered one of the top two defensive backs available in the draft (alongside Vontae Davis), and drew comparisons to Terence Newman. However, after Jenkins ran a comparably slow 40-yard dash, some scouts considered him better suited for the safety position.

New Orleans Saints
The New Orleans Saints selected Jenkins in the first round (14th overall) of the 2009 NFL Draft. Jenkins was the first cornerback to be drafted by the Saints in the first round since Oregon's Alex Molden went eleventh overall in the 1996 NFL Draft.

2009
On August 9, 2009, the New Orleans Saints signed Jenkins on a five-year, $19 million contract that includes $10.59 million guaranteed. Their agreement ended Jenkins' 11-day training camp holdout.

Jenkins entered training camp late and was slated as a backup, but competed for a job as a starting cornerback against Jabari Greer. Head coach Sean Payton named Jenkins the third cornerback on the depth chart to begin the regular season, behind Tracy Porter and Jabari Greer.

He made his professional regular season debut in the New Orleans Saints' season-opener against the Detroit Lions and made one solo tackle in their 45–27 victory. He made first career tackle on running back Aaron Brown and stopped him from scoring on an 87-yard kick return in the third quarter. He was inactive for the Saints' Week 4 victory against the New York Jets after spraining his ankle the previous week. Jenkins was sidelined for Week 6 after further aggravating his ankle injury. On November 22, 2009, Jenkins earned his first career start and recorded seven combined tackles, two pass deflections, and intercepted his first career pass during a 38–7 victory at the Tampa Bay Buccaneers in Week 11. Jenkins intercepted a pass attempt by quarterback Josh Freeman that was originally intended for wide receiver Antonio Bryant and returned it for a 14-yard gain in the second quarter. He earned his first start after Jabari Greer sustained a groin injury in Week 9 and Tracy Porter sprained his MCL in Week 10. Jenkins remained the starter for the next six games after Greer was sidelined for the next seven games (Weeks 10–16) and Porter was sidelined for the next four games (11–14) In Week 13, he collected a season-high nine solo tackles and broke up a pass in a 33–30 win at the Washington Redskins. On December 27, 2009, Jenkins made a season-high ten combined tackles (eight solo) in the Saints' 20–17 loss to the Tampa Bay Buccaneers in Week 16. Jenkins finished his rookie season in 2009 with 55 combined tackles (49 solo), four pass deflections, and an interception in 14 games and six starts.

The New Orleans Saints finished first in the NFC South with a 13–3 record, clinching a first round bye and home-field advantage throughout the playoffs. On January 16, 2010, Jenkins appeared in his first career playoff game as the Saints' defeated the Arizona Cardinals 45–14 in the NFC Divisional Round. The Saints reached the Super Bowl after winning the NFC Championship Game in a 31–28 win (Bountygate) against the Minnesota Vikings. On February 7, 2010, Jenkins appeared in Super Bowl XLIV and recorded five solo tackles and a pass deflection in the Saints' 31–17 victory against the Indianapolis Colts.

2010
On May 8, 2010, head coach Sean Payton stated his intentions to move Jenkins to safety while addressing the media at the Saints' rookie minicamp press conference. He was moved after the Saints' drafted Patrick Robinson in the first round of the 2010 NFL Draft. With the addition of Robinson, Jenkins would've entered camp as the fifth cornerback on the roster behind Jabari Greer, Tracy Porter, Randall Gay, and Patrick Robinson. During training camp, he competed to be a backup safety against Usama Young. Head coach Sean Payton named Jenkins the starting free safety to start the season after Darren Sharper underwent microfracture surgery and was placed on the physically unable to perform list.

On October 3, 2010, Jenkins recorded four solo tackles and made his first career sack on quarterback Jimmy Clausen during a 16–14 win against the Carolina Panthers in Week 4. In Week 7, he collected a season-high nine combined tackles in the Saints' 30–17 loss to the Cleveland Browns. He was inactive for the Saints' Week 11 victory against the Seattle Seahawks due to a neck injury he sustained the previous game. On November 25, 2010, Jenkins recorded four combined tackles and made a key play in the fourth quarter to spark a comeback by the Saints in a 30–27 victory over the Dallas Cowboys in Week 12. Jenkins forced a fumble by wide receiver Roy Williams and recovered it with less than 3:20 remaining and the Saints down 27–23. Saints' head coach Sean Payton said Jenkins performed "one of those plays that inspires everybody on the team". Jenkins was named NFC Defensive Player of the Week for his performance. In Week 14, he made four solo tackles, three pass deflections, two interceptions, and his first career touchdown during a 31–13 victory against the St. Louis Rams in Week 14. He returned an interception by Sam Bradford for a 96-yard touchdown in the third quarter. Jenkins received NFC Defensive Player of the Week honors for the second time in 2010 for his performance. Jenkins injured his knee in the Saints' Week 17 loss to the Tampa Bay Buccaneers and was forced to miss the NFC Wildcard Game. He finished his first season as a safety with 64 combined tackles (54 solo), 12 pass deflections, two interceptions, a forced fumble, a fumble recovery, a sack, and a touchdown in 15 games and 15 starts.

2011
He entered training camp as the de facto starting free safety after the Saints chose not to re-sign Darren Sharper during the offseason. Defensive coordinator Gregg Williams retained Jenkins as the starting free safety to begin the 2012 regular season, alongside strong safety Roman Harper.

In Week 8, Jenkins recorded five solo tackles, a pass deflection, and sacked quarterback Sam Bradford in the Saints' 31–21 loss at the St. Louis Rams. On December 11, 2011, Jenkins collected a season-high ten combined tackles (eight solo) during a 22–17 victory at the Tennessee Titans in Week 14. Jenkins was inactive in Week 17 and was rested by head coach Sean Payton as the Saints had already clinched a playoff berth with a 12–3 record. Jenkins completed the 2011 season with 77 combined tackles (63 solo), nine passes defensed, and a sack in 15 games and 15 starts.

The New Orleans Saints finished first in the NFC South with a 13–3 record. On January 7, 2012, Jenkins started his first career playoff game and recorded five combined tackles during a 45–28 win against the Detroit Lions in the NFC Wildcard Game. The following week, he started in the NFC Divisional Round and made eight solo tackles, a pass deflection, and sacked quarterback Alex Smith in the Saints' 36–32 loss.

2012
The New Orleans Saints hired Steve Spagnuolo as their new defensive coordinator after Gregg Williams was indefinitely suspended for his involvement in the New Orleans Saints bounty scandal. Head coach Sean Payton was also suspended for the 2012 season and named linebackers coach Joe Vitt the interim head coach. Vitt named Aaron Kromer the interim head coach for the first six weeks after he received a suspension for the first six regular season games for his part in the Bounty scandal. Jenkins and Roman Harper were both retained as the starting safeties despite the coaching changes.

On November 5, 2012, he collected a season-high 13 combined tackles (seven solo) in the Saints' 28–13 victory against the Philadelphia Eagles in Week 9. In Week 11, Jenkins recorded six combined tackles, broke up a pass, and returned an interception for a touchdown during a 38–17 victory at the Oakland Raiders. He returned an interception by quarterback Carson Palmer, that was intended for tight end Brandon Myers, for a 55-yard touchdown in the first quarter. The touchdown was Jenkins' second pick six of his career. Jenkins was inactive for the last three regular season games (Weeks 15–17) due to a hamstring injury. Jenkins finished the 2012 season with 94 combined tackles (65 solo), seven pass deflections, an interception, and a touchdown in 13 games and 13 starts.

2013
The New Orleans Saints' new defensive coordinator Rob Ryan held a competition to name starting safeties between Jenkins, Roman Harper, and rookie 2013 first round pick Kenny Vaccaro throughout training camp. Head coach Sean Payton named Jenkins the starting free safety to begin the regular season, opposite strong safety Roman Harper.

On October 13, 2013, Jenkins recorded eight combined tackles, a pass deflection, and earned a career-high 1½ sacks on Tom Brady during a 30–27 loss at the New England Patriots in Week 6. Jenkins was inactive for two games (Weeks 9–10) due to a back injury. In Week 13, he collected a season-high ten combined tackles (seven solo) in the Saints' 34–7 loss at the Seattle Seahawks. He finished the 2013 season with 68 combined tackles (44 solo), six pass deflections, 2½ sacks, and two interceptions in 14 games and 14 starts.

The New Orleans Saints finished second in the NFC South with an 11–5 record and defeated the Philadelphia Eagles 26–24 in the NFC Wildcard Game. On January 11, 2014, Jenkins played in his last game as a member of the Saints and recorded five combined tackles during 23–15 loss at the Seattle Seahawks in the NFC Divisional Round.

Philadelphia Eagles

2014
Jenkins became an unrestricted free agent for the first time in his career in 2014. He garnered interest from multiple teams, but did not receive a contract offer from the Saints. On March 11, 2014, the Philadelphia Eagles signed Jenkins to a three-year, $16.25 million contract that included $8.50 million guaranteed.
He entered camp slated as the de facto starting free safety. Head coach Chip Kelly officially named him the starter to begin the regular season, along with strong safety Nate Allen.

On September 28, 2014, Jenkins recorded seven combined tackles, a pass deflection, and returned an interception by quarterback Colin Kaepernick for a 53-yard touchdown during a 26–21 loss at the San Francisco 49ers in Week 4. The pick six marked his third touchdown of his career and was his third consecutive game with an interception. In Week 15, he collected a season-high eight solo tackles in the Eagles' 38–27 loss to the Dallas Cowboys. Jenkins finished the 2014 season with 80 combined tackles (64 solo), 15 passes defensed, three interceptions, a forced fumble, a fumble recovery, and a touchdown in 16 games and 16 starts.

2015
Jenkins returned as the starting free safety in 2015 and played alongside strong safety Walter Thurmond. On October 25, 2015, he made a season-high ten combined tackles (eight solo) and broke up a pass during a 20–19 loss to the Miami Dolphins in Week 10. On December 6, 2015, Jenkins recorded seven combined tackles, deflected a pass, and returned an interception for a touchdown in the Eagles 35–28 victory at the New England Patriots in Week 13. He intercepted a pass by quarterback Tom Brady, that was thrown to Danny Amendola at the goal line, and returned it for a 99-yard touchdown in the third quarter. It became Jenkins fourth career pick six and his performance earned him NFC Defensive Player of the Week. On December 28, 2015, the Philadelphia Eagles fired head coach Chip Kelly after finishing Week 16 with a 6–9 record. Jenkins finished his second and last season under defensive coordinator Billy Davis with a career-high 109 combined tackles (90 solo), ten pass deflections, two interceptions, three forced fumbles, and a fumble recovery in 16 games and 16 starts. Pro football focus gave Jenkins an overall grade of 85.8, which ranked second among all qualifying safeties in 2015.
 On January 25, 2016, Jenkins announced via Twitter that he was added to the 2016 Pro Bowl after originally being named a seventh alternate.

2016
On February 22, 2016, the Philadelphia Eagles signed Jenkins to a four-year, $35 million contract extension with $16 million guaranteed and a signing bonus of $7.50 million. Jenkins also had a year remaining on his previous contract from 2014. In total, Jenkins is due $40.50 million over the next five seasons (2016–2020).

The Philadelphia Eagles' new head coach Doug Pederson retained Jenkins as a safety, alongside Rodney McLeod. In Week 2, he collected five combined tackles, deflected a pass, and sacked quarterback Jay Cutler during a 29–14 win at the Chicago Bears. On October 16, 2016, Jenkins recorded six combined tackles, two pass deflections, and returned an interception for a touchdown in the Eagles' 27–20 loss at the Washington Redskins in Week 6. He intercepted a pass by Kirk Cousins that was initially intended for tight end Vernon Davis and returned it for a 64-yard touchdown in the second quarter. On December 22, 2016, Jenkins made six combined tackles, a season-high three pass deflections, intercepted two passes, and returned one for a touchdown in a 24–19 victory against the New York Giants in Week 16. He intercepted a pass by quarterback Eli Manning originally intended for tight end Will Tye and returned it for a 34-yard touchdown in the first quarter. It became Jenkins' sixth pick six of his career. Jenkins completed the 2016 season with 72 combined tackles (47 solo), nine passes defensed, three interceptions, two touchdowns, and a sack in 16 games and 16 starts. He was ranked  the 90th best player in the league on the NFL Top 100 Players of 2017.

2017

Defensive coordinator Jim Schwartz retained Jenkins and Rodney McLeod as the starting safety duo to begin the 2017 season. In Week 7, Jenkins collected a career-high ten solo tackles and a sack during a 34–24 win against the Washington Redskins. In Week 12, he made two combined tackles, a pass deflection, and an interception during a 31–3 victory against the Chicago Bears. It marked Jenkins' second consecutive game with an interception. On December 19, 2017, it was announced that Jenkins was voted to the 2017 Pro Bowl. (He was unable to participate because the Eagles played in the Super Bowl.) He finished the 2017 season with 76 combined tackles (63 solo), eight pass deflections, two interceptions, and a sack in 16 games and 16 starts. Pro Football Focus gave Jenkins an overall grade of 84.2, which ranked 19th among all qualifying safeties in 2017. He was ranked 96th by his peers on the NFL Top 100 Players of 2018.

The Philadelphia Eagles finished first in the NFC East with a 13–3 record and received a first round bye and home-field advantage throughout the playoffs. The Eagles advanced to the Super Bowl after defeating the Atlanta Falcons 15–10 in the NFC Divisional Round and the Minnesota Vikings 38–7 in the NFC Championship Game. On February 4, 2018, Jenkins started in Super Bowl LII and recorded four solo tackles and a pass deflection as the Eagles defeated the New England Patriots 41–33. The victory in Super Bowl LII marked Jenkins' second Super Bowl victory and became the second time he helped a team achieve its first Super Bowl win in franchise history.

2018
In week 2 against the Tampa Bay Buccaneers, Jenkins recorded 5 tackles and forced his first fumble of the season on wide receiver Mike Evans which was recovered by teammate Jordan Hicks during the 27–21 loss.
In week 8 against the Jacksonville Jaguars in London, Jenkins recovered a fumble forced by teammate Avonte Maddox on wide receiver Keelan Cole during the 24–18 win.
In week 12 against the New York Giants, Jenkins recorded his first interception of the season off a pass thrown by Eli Manning and returned it 25 yards during the 25–22 win.
In the following week's game against the Washington Redskins, Jenkins recorded his first sack of the season on Colt McCoy during the 28–13 win.
In week 15 against the Los Angeles Rams, Jenkins recorded a season high 12 tackles during the 30–23 win.
Jenkins finished the season with 97 tackles (79 solo), one sack, three forced fumbles, one fumble recovery, eight pass deflections, and one interception in 16 games started.

In the Wild Card Round of the playoffs against the Chicago Bears, Jenkins recorded 5 tackles during the 16–15 win which became known as Double Doink.
In the Divisional Round of the playoffs against Jenkins' former team, the New Orleans Saints, he recorded a team high 10 tackles during the 20–14 loss.

2019

In week 6 against the Minnesota Vikings, Jenkins recorded a season high 8 tackles and forced a fumble on rookie running back Alexander Mattison which was recovered by teammate Kamu Grugier-Hill during the 38–20 loss.
In week 12 against the Seattle Seahawks, Jenkins recorded 6 tackles and his first two sacks of the season on Russell Wilson during the 17–9 loss.
In week 16 against the Dallas Cowboys, Jenkins recorded 5 tackles and recovered a fumble forced by teammate Fletcher Cox on rookie running back Tony Pollard during the 17–9 win.
In week 17 against the New York Giants, Jenkins forced a fumble on rookie quarterback Daniel Jones which was recovered by Fletcher Cox during the 34–17 win.
Jenkins finished the season with 80 combined tackles (62 solo), 2.5 sacks, four forced fumbles, one fumble recovery, and eight pass deflections in 16 games started.

In the Wild Card Round of the playoffs against the Seattle Seahawks, Jenkins recorded a team high 9 tackles and sacked Russell Wilson twice during the 17–9 loss.

The Eagles declined to pick up Jenkins' contract option for the 2020 season, making him a free agent at the start of the new league year on March 18, 2020.

New Orleans Saints (second stint)
On March 23, 2020, Jenkins signed a four-year, $32 million contract to return to the New Orleans Saints.

In Week 2 against the Las Vegas Raiders on Monday Night Football, Jenkins recorded his first sack of the season on Derek Carr during the 34–24 loss.
In Week 9 against the Tampa Bay Buccaneers on Sunday Night Football, Jenkins recorded his first interception of the season off a pass thrown by Tom Brady during the 38–3 win.
In Week 17 against the Carolina Panthers, Jenkins recorded his 3rd interception of the season off a pass thrown by Teddy Bridgewater during the 33–7 win.  Jenkins' third interception of the season tied his single season career high.

On March 30, 2022, Jenkins announced his retirement. He is also the only player who has ever been on a team that defeated both Tom Brady and Peyton Manning during a Super Bowl.

NFL career statistics

Regular season

Personal life
Jenkins started his own charity called The Malcolm Jenkins Foundation. According to their website, The Malcolm Jenkins Foundation "is committed to youth development initiatives and programs which emphasize mentorship, character development, leadership, education, life skills, health and recreation." He also started the Let's Listen Together initiative where he talks to Superintendent of Police Michael Chitwood to discuss social justice issues affecting police and community relations following shootings of unarmed people by police officers.

National anthem protest
On September 19, 2016, Jenkins began raising his fist during the national anthem to bring attention to racial inequality and continued to do it every week throughout 2016 and 2017. He said he would not stop protesting during the national anthem even if the NFL or his team's owner prohibited players from doing so. Jenkins has met on Capitol Hill with legislators, written an opinion-editorial in The Washington Post and signed a letter to NFL commissioner Roger Goodell explaining his perspective on the issues.

On June 4, 2020, Jenkins posted an Instagram video in response to Drew Brees's comments that criticized protests during the National Anthem.

In July 2020, Jenkins received backlash after issuing a message that was seen by many in the Jewish community as dismissive in response to DeSean Jackson posting anti-semitic posts on his Instagram account that included a quote falsely attributed to Adolf Hitler. Jenkins said that Jackson's posts were a "distraction" and that "Jewish people aren’t our problem."

References

External links

Philadelphia Eagles bio
New Orleans Saints bio
 Malcolm Jenkins Foundation

1987 births
Living people
People from Piscataway, New Jersey
Piscataway High School alumni
Sportspeople from East Orange, New Jersey
Sportspeople from Middlesex County, New Jersey
Players of American football from New Jersey
All-American college football players
American football cornerbacks
American football safeties
New Orleans Saints players
Ohio State Buckeyes football players
Philadelphia Eagles players
African-American players of American football
Unconferenced Pro Bowl players
National Conference Pro Bowl players
21st-century African-American sportspeople
20th-century African-American people